Evergreen may refer to:
Evergreen, Hidalgo County, Texas
Evergreen, San Jacinto County, Texas
Evergreen, Starr County, Texas, a census-designated place
Evergreen, Titus County, Texas
Evergreen, Washington County, Texas
Old Evergreen, Texas in Lee County
former name of Lincoln, Texas in Lee County